Graeme Paul Doran (born 2 December 1979) is an English geneticist and a former first-class cricketer.

Doran was born at Liverpool in December 1979. He later went up to St Edmund Hall at the University of Oxford, where he studied genetics and biochemistry to doctorate level under the guidance of Dame Kay Davies and Sir Edwin Southern. While studying at Oxford, he made two appearances in first-class cricket for Oxford University in The University Matches of 2004 and 2005 against Cambridge University.

Since graduating, he has carried out research at MIT and Harvard.

References

External links

1979 births
Living people
People from Liverpool
Alumni of St Edmund Hall, Oxford
English cricketers
Oxford University cricketers
English molecular biologists
English geneticists